The Ironstone Mountain is a mountain located in the Central Highlands region of Tasmania, Australia. Part of Great Western Tiers escarpment, the mountain is situated south of the small country village of Mole Creek.

The highest point is marked with a trig point, but more dominant is the slightly lower part of the mountain depicted here in the information box.

Location and access 
The mountain is at grid reference 563819 UTM Zone 55S (Universal Transverse Mercator coordinate system) and high resolution topographical information is available on Tasmap Lake Mackenzie (4438) 1:25000.

Access to Ironstone Mountain is mainly from two walking tracks. The closest access is from the north via Mole Creek, Caveside and Westrope Road to the Western Creek Track which follows the eastern side of the gully formed by Western Creek. Another access route is from the east via Deloraine, Meander, Smoko Road and the Mount Ironstone Track.

See also

 List of highest mountains of Tasmania

References

External links

Ironstone
Ironstone, Mountain